Results of the 2001 Sri Lankan general election by electoral district.

Number of votes

Percentage of votes

Seats

See also
Results of the 2001 Sri Lankan general election by province

References
 

2001 Sri Lankan parliamentary election
Election results in Sri Lanka